Manoochehr Sadeghi (born April 13, 1938) is a Persian-American naturalized citizen, born in Tehran, Iran.  He is considered a Grandmaster or Ostad of the santur, a Persian hammered dulcimer. He has been lecturing, teaching, recording and performing Persian classical music on the santur professionally for over 50 years. In 2002, Sadeghi received the Durfee Foundation Master Musician Award and he is a recipient of a 2003 National Heritage Fellowship from the National Endowment of the Arts, which is the United States' highest honor in the folk and traditional arts.

Early life 

Sadeghi began studying the santur at the age of 7 with a music teacher coincidentally named Manoochehr Sadeghian.  By the age of 14 he became the prized pupil of a legendary figure in Persian classical music, the late Ostad Abol Hassan Saba;  who was a master and creator of the Radif of Saba, considered today's manual to mastering Persian classical music.  At the age of 19 he performed in Saba's first orchestra of the State Fine Arts Department of Iran.  After performing on Iran's television and radio, he went on to stage live concerts around the world for various heads of state. In 1964, Sadeghi emigrated to the United States to pursue his education and career. First at the California State University, Fullerton, and then at UCLA, where he began teaching and performing while earning his degrees.  In 1973 he was awarded the Fulbright-Hays Doctoral Dissertation Research Abroad Fellowship Program.

Career 
Sadeghi is recording his latest album, "Solh Ensemble",  with world-renowned musician and composer John Barnes; Barnes co-produced Michael Jackson's 1987 Bad album.  Sadeghi has a variety of students whom he teaches at home and on the internet.  Sadeghi is compiling his lessons into an online music school to preserve his knowledge, technique and personal style through contemporary Persian classical improvisation.  He is preparing for a series of concerts after the release of his next album.  He taught private lessons in Iran from 1953 to 1964 and then in the United States from 1966 to the present.  Sadeghi was a teacher at the Conservatory of Persian National Music in Iran from 1958–1964 on the faculty at UCLA’s Department of Ethnomusicology from 1967 to 1997. He also taught Persian classical music theory, history and performance, and gave annual concerts on campus and abroad.

Notable live performances 

 Command performances for Queen Elizabeth II - Vice President Nixon, King Hussain of Jordan, King Fasil of Iraq, Ronald Reagan, 1953-1964.
 India-Persia - Manoochehr Sadeghi (santur), Ali Akbar Khan (sarod), Labera Theatre, Santa Barbara, 1983.
 Classical Music of the East – India, Persia, Arabia - M. Sadeghi (santur) & The Jazz and World Music Society, Santa Barbara, 1983.
 Music of Iran - Manoochehr Sadeghi, Music Director, Hayedeh, vocalist, UCLA, Society for Ethnomusicology, 1984.
 East West Fusion - Manoochehr Sadeghi (santur), L. Subramaniam (violin) and ensemble, UCLA Royce Hall, 1986.
 Music and Dance on the Grass - annual international folk festival, UCLA, 1967-1997 - Honoring the 600th anniversary of the birth of Hafez
 An Evening of Persian Music - special guest santur virtuoso Manoochehr Sadeghi, Lotte
 Sacred Landmarks - Lehmann Hall, UC Santa Barbara, 1993 - concert for the L. A. Festival, All Saints Church, Pasadena, CA, 1993.
 Persian Festival - Persian music ensemble directed by Manoochehr Sadeghi, UCLA Fowler Museum, 1995.
 Traditional Persian Music - Earth Music Center of Indiana, IUPUI Lecture Hall Auditorium, Indianapolis, IN, 1998.
 World Festival of Sacred Music - Mystic Voices - Music of Devotion in Islam and Hinduism," concert Immanuel Presbyterian Church, Los Angeles, 1999.
 Smithsonian Institution - Sackler & Freer Gallery 2003 Vision Concert Series
 The Kennedy Center - 2003 Vision Concert Series
 Japan American Theatre - 2003 Vision Concert Series
 J. Paul Getty - 2004 Fusion concert with Pejman Hadadi and Adam del Monte
 Grand Performances - 2004 Fusion concert with John Belizikjian and Adam del Monte
 University of Illinois at Urbana-Champaign - 2004 Improvisation Conference - Professor Bruno Nettl
 The Virginia National Folk Festival - 2007 concert for the National Folk Festival in Richmond Virginia
 Disney Hall - 2007 Concert with the Los Angeles Master Chorale

References

External links 
 Santur.com - The Art of Persian Music
 April conference at Illinois to focus on improvisation in music - University of Illinois
 Book details - Dariush Tala'i - Traditional Persian Art Music
 The Struggle for Iran - radio documentary of the Iran Project
 Takin' It Easy (1978)
 

1938 births
Iranian emigrants to the United States
California State University, Fullerton people
Child classical musicians
Contemporary classical music performers
Ethnomusicologists
Iranian composers
Iranian santur players
Kurdish musicians
Living people
Musicians from Massachusetts
National Heritage Fellowship winners
Naturalized citizens of the United States
Musicians from Los Angeles
People from Tehran
University of California, Los Angeles alumni
World Music Awards winners
World music musicians
Articles containing video clips